Høgdebrotet is a mountain in Vågå Municipality in Innlandet county, Norway. The mountain is surrounded by several other notable mountains including Bukkehåmåren to the northeast, Rasletinden to the south, Tjønnholstinden and Tjønnholsoksle to the southwest, Eggi and Surtningssue to the northwest, and Besshø and Besseggen to the north.

See also
List of mountains of Norway by height

References

Jotunheimen
Vågå
Mountains of Innlandet